Cabo de Gata is a cape located in Níjar, Almería in the south of Spain, one of the biggest capes. It is the driest place in the Iberian Peninsula (150-170 mm average precipitation, being the lowest 52 mm in 1981). However, the area that it occupies is not considered a desert, even though there is one nearby: the Tabernas Desert, located 30 km in a northwest direction. The lowest temperature registered in Cabo de Gata was 0.1 °C.

San José, Las Negras, Agua Amarga, Isleta del Moro, Rodalquilar, San Miguel, Almadraba de Moteleva, Fernán Pérez, Las Hortichuelas, Pozo de los Frailes, Los Escullos, Níjar and Carboneras are towns found in Cabo de Gata. The lighthouse is a famous landmark.

On 26 March 2008 it was declared Parque Natural.

References

External links
 

Geography of the Province of Almería
Gata
Cabo de Gata-Níjar Natural Park